The Vibe Hotel is a hotel on Hollywood Boulevard, Los Angeles, California, originally known as the Movie Town Motel. It was built, owned and operated in 1952 by the Italian immigrant brothers Salvador and Antonio Pinelli. It  is considered to be part of the “Hollywood Strip” that runs through the heart of Hollywood beneath the Hollywood Sign, and past Hollywood and Highland where the Dolby Theatre is now the permanent home to the Oscars every year.

History
In the late fifties and early sixties this motel was a stop over for many Hollywood industry types because of its location proximate to the studios. Many TV and film scenes have been shot at the Vibe Hotel, including an episode of Shark starring James Woods.

The hotel fell into disrepair in the 1990s as organized crime and gangs spread into this area of Los Angeles. In the early 2000s, the Movie Town Motel was remodeled as part of the restoration of the Hollywood area, and renamed the Vibe Hotel.

Design
Built in the classic era and exaggerated style of Googie architecture with space age ideals and rocket ship dreams that was part of post World War II American futurism, the donut-shaped motel features retro design elements of that period, along with a motif of bright colors, tile and furniture all reminiscent of the fifties and sixties. The classic donut shape design refers to the rectangle building that surrounds a courtyard in the center, providing a secure space for customers to socialize in the common areas.

See also
 List of motels

External links
 http://www.vibehotel.com

Hotels in Los Angeles
Buildings and structures in Hollywood, Los Angeles
Motels in the United States
Hotels established in 1952
Hotel buildings completed in 1952